Chuni Panna is a horror-comedy Bengali television soap opera that was premiered on 11 November 2019 on Star Jalsha and is also available on the digital platform Hotstar. It was produced by Shree Venkatesh Films and starred Annwesha Hazra, Dibyojyoti Dutta and Tulika Basu as the leads along with Moyna Mukherjee, Debdut Ghosh, Payel De, Chhanda Chattopadhyay in pivotal roles.

Premise
Throughout her childhood, Chuni aspires to be a ghost hunter. Chuni wants to meet a ghost but does not want to marry because she  is scared of in-laws. Coincidentally, she grows up to marry Nirbhik, who lives in a haunted house "Abhoy Bhavan", (later on which turns out to be "Bhoy Bhavan") with a ghost called Panna. After the marriage, Panna, the vengeful ghost of the former owner of the house makes Chuni's life miserable.

Cast

Main 
 Annwesha Hazra as Chayanika Mallik aka Chuni
 Dibyojyoti Dutta as Nirbhik Mallik 
 Tulika Basu as Panna

Recurring 

 Debdut Ghosh 
 Moyna Mukherjee 
 Parthasarathi Deb 
 Prerana Roy
 Payel De as Madhuja Mallik, daughter-in-law of Mallik house 
 Chhanda Chattopadhyay
 Oindrila Saha as Lalita 
 Gulshanara Khatun as Apsara
Anindita Das
Arijita Mukhopadhyay
Ayesha Bhattacharya
Sourav Chatterjee

References

External links
 Chuni Panna on Disney+ Hotstar

Bengali-language television programming in India
Star Jalsha original programming
2019 Indian television series debuts
2020 Indian television series endings